Kevin Houston is a senior lecturer in the School of Mathematics at the University of Leeds, a post he has held since 2005. Prior to that, he was a lecturer at Middlesex University and a research associate at the University of Liverpool. His research is on singularity theory. He is education secretary of the London Mathematical Society.

Books 
Houston is the author of the book
 

In addition he is an editor of:

References

External links
 
 

Living people
21st-century British mathematicians
Date of birth missing (living people)
Academics of the University of Leeds
Academics of the University of Liverpool
Academics of Middlesex University
Year of birth missing (living people)